Jyles Christopher Tucker (born September 18, 1983 in Dover, New Jersey) is a former American football linebacker. He was originally signed by the San Diego Chargers as an undrafted free agent in 2007. He played college football at Wake Forest. Tucker has also played for the Carolina Panthers.

Early years
His hometown is Dover, New Jersey, but Tucker played high school football at Morristown-Beard School, and a post-graduate season at Hargrave Military Academy.

Professional career
Tucker was one of five nominees for the Diet Pepsi NFL Rookie of the Week award in Week 17. He recorded three tackles, three sacks and two forced fumbles  and a touchdown in the Chargers' 30–17 win over the Oakland Raiders.

Tucker was awarded the Week 17 AFC Defensive player of the week for his performance against the Oakland Raiders.

On August 25, 2008, it was announced that the Chargers re-signed Tucker for 5 years at a reported $14 million.

On July 28, 2011, he was released by San Diego.

References

External links
San Diego Chargers bio
Wake Forest Demon Deacons bio

1983 births
Living people
People from Dover, New Jersey
American football defensive ends
American football outside linebackers
Wake Forest Demon Deacons football players
San Diego Chargers players
Morristown-Beard School alumni
Hargrave Military Academy alumni